Cáceres is one of the two constituencies represented in the Assembly of Extremadura, the regional legislature of the Autonomous Community of Extremadura. The constituency currently elects 29 deputies. Its boundaries correspond to those of the Spanish province of Cáceres. The electoral system uses the D'Hondt method and a closed-list proportional representation, with a minimum threshold of five percent.

Electoral system
The constituency was created as per the Statute of Autonomy of Extremadura of 1983 and was first contested in the 1983 regional election. The Statute provided for the two provinces in Extremadura—Badajoz and Cáceres—to be established as multi-member districts in the Assembly of Extremadura, with this regulation being maintained under the 1987 regional electoral law. Each constituency is entitled to an initial minimum of 20 seats, with the remaining 25 being distributed in proportion to their populations. The exception was the 1983 election, when each constituency was allocated a fixed number of seats: 35 for Badajoz and 30 for Cáceres.

Voting is on the basis of universal suffrage, which comprises all nationals over eighteen, registered in Extremadura and in full enjoyment of their political rights. Amendments to the electoral law in 2011 required for Extremadurans abroad to apply for voting before being permitted to vote, a system known as "begged" or expat vote. Seats are elected using the D'Hondt method and a closed list proportional representation, with an electoral threshold of five percent of valid votes—which includes blank ballots—being applied in each constituency. Alternatively, parties failing to reach the threshold in one of the constituencies are also entitled to enter the seat distribution as long as they run candidates in both districts and reach five percent regionally.

The electoral law allows for parties and federations registered in the interior ministry, coalitions and groupings of electors to present lists of candidates. Parties and federations intending to form a coalition ahead of an election are required to inform the relevant Electoral Commission within ten days of the election call—fifteen before 1985—whereas groupings of electors need to secure the signature of at least two percent of the electorate in the constituencies for which they seek election—one-thousandth of the electorate, with a compulsory minimum of 500 signatures, until 1985—disallowing electors from signing for more than one list of candidates.

Deputies

Elections

2019 regional election

2015 regional election

2011 regional election

2007 regional election

2003 regional election

1999 regional election

1995 regional election

1991 regional election

1987 regional election

1983 regional election

References

Assembly of Extremadura constituencies
Province of Cáceres
Constituencies established in 1983
1983 establishments in Spain